Antoni Niemczak (born 17 November 1955) is a retired long-distance runner from Poland, who won the inaugural 1984 edition of the Vienna Marathon, clocking 2:12:17 on March 25, 1984. He finished in eighth place at the 1986 European Championships in Stuttgart, West Germany. His best marathon time is 2:09:41, which he ran on October 28, 1990, in the Chicago Marathon. He finished in second place with a margin of less than one second between him and Martin Pitayo. Antoni was ranked seventh in the world for the marathon in 1990, the same year he won the San Francisco Marathon.

Suspension
Niemczak tested positive for the anabolic steroid Nandrolone after finishing second at the 1986 New York City Marathon. Although the steroid was known to have been prescribed following dental surgery and rather than to improve performance, Niemczak received a two-year suspension from the sport.

Achievements

References

 1984 Year Ranking
 1990 Year Ranking

1955 births
Living people
Polish male long-distance runners
Doping cases in athletics
Polish sportspeople in doping cases
Place of birth missing (living people)